Luigi Papafava (1838–1908) was an Italian painter and engraver.

Biography
He was born and resident of Padua. He trained under Vincenzo Gazzotto and painted genre, portraits, and religious subjects. He was also active in restorations of paintings and frescoes.

He worked in the studio of Luigi Naccari. He completed an engraved portrait of Lodovico Menin in that studio. In 1881, he exhibited at Venice, Il Marendino; in 1884 at Turin, Venditore di capre al vecchio mercato; I primi passi; and at the 1884 Promotrice of Turin, Invasione and Venditore di Zolfanelli. In 1890 at Florence, he exhibited La bozzetta dell'ogio; in 1908, Inverno and Partita a briscola. He painted an altarpiece of St Joseph for the church of San Salvatore a Camin in Padua.

References

19th-century Italian painters
Italian male painters
20th-century Italian painters
1838 births
1908 deaths
Painters from Padua
19th-century Italian male artists
20th-century Italian male artists